Aastrup is a manor house and estate in Elverdamsdalen, between Tølløse and Hvalsø, Lejre Municipality, some 40 kilometres west of Copenhagen, Denmark.

History

Krabbe and Kruse
The village of Aastrup is mentioned several times in written records from the Middle Ages. In the early 16th century it was dissolved and its farms merged under a manor with the same name. The first owner of the manor was Erik Krabbe; He was the son of rigsmarsk Tyge Krabbe, a central figure in the uprise against Christian II (1481-1559). Erik Krabbe instigated that Saxo Gramaticus's Danmarkskrønike from the 12th century was republished in 1534.

Aster Krabbe's death in 1564, Aastrup was passed to his son Glob Krabbe. Glob's brother Christian Krabbe inherited the estate in 1582. He sold it to treasurer Enevold Kruse in circa 1596 when he married Else Marsvin. He constructed a new main building in circa 1613.

Changing owners
The estate remained in the hands of the  Kruse family until it was purchased by Jørgen Seefeld in 1641.

Peder Lauridsen Scavenius purchased the estate in 1664. He belonged to the new nobility that was appointed by Frederick III in the early days of the Absolute monarchy. After Scavenius' death, Aastrup was passed on to his son-in-law Niels Benzon Aastrup and then his grandson Peder Benzon. Peder was also the owner of a number of other estates, including Benzonseje, Benzonsdal and Gislingegaard.

Gregers Juel purchased Aastrup in 1714. He was an army officer but left the army when he missed a promotion in 1716.

Eichel family, 17361806

Johannes Eichel purchased Aastrup in 1736 and turned it into a stamhus for his family later that same year. The effect of a stamhus was that the estate could no longer be sold or divided between heirs. A rpadside memorial to Johan Wichel designed by Johannes Wiedewelt  was installed at Vester Sæby Hill.

The first holder of the stamhus was Just Valentin Eichel- He was married to Marianne Grove (1705-1833).  They only had one child, a daughter, Elisabeth Hedevig Eichel. She was only nine years old when her father died in 1738. In 1744, when she was just 15 years old, she was married to her guardian, Caspar Christopher Bartholin (1700-1765), a Supreme Court justice and 28 years her senior. In 1745, he sold Kås Manor. In 1760, he was appointed as acting justidiarius of the Supreme Court.

Caspar Christopher Bartholin was succeeded by their son Johan Bartholin Eichel as holder of Stamhuset Aastrup. He was appointed as judge at Hof- og Stadsretten in 1771 and at the Supreme Court in 1773. He was succeeded by his son of the same name as holder of Stamhuset Aastrup. Johan Bartholin Eichel resided at Aastrup with his wife Charlotte Grothschilling	and the estate manager Jens Christian Qwortrup at the time of the 1801 census. Their staff comprised a male servant, a coachman, a housekeeper, a female cook, a maid a "brewery girl" and a "poultry girl".	

In 1803, the stamhus was dissolved with royal approval. In 1806, was then purchased by Ulrik Christian Von Schmidten In 1809, Johan Bartholin Eichel purchased another manor, Svanholm, but sold it again in 1813.

Ulrik Christian Von Schmidten's interest in Aastrup was purely speculative. He was known as the "manor butcher" (herregårdsslagteren) due to the large number of manors that he bought, alone or with partners, only to divide them into smaller farms and sell them again shortly thereafter.

Jofoed family

In 1810,  Ulrik Chr. Von Schmidten sold Aastrup the Copenhagen-based merchant and ship-owner Hans Peder Kofoed.He had already bought another estate in the area, Holbæk Ladegård, which he aold again in 1812. He had also constructed a large townhouse in Christianshavn, now known as the Heering House after a later owner., founder of the company behind Cherry Heering Peter F. Heering.

His widow Marie Kofoed kept it after his death in 1812. She made large donations to charity and created a number of grants for indigent people on the estate. In 1838, Marie Kofoed sold the estate to  Siegfred Victor Raben.

Dannemand's foundation

Frederik Vilhelm Dannemand, an illegitimate son of Frederik VI, purchased the estate in 1842. He turned the estate into a stift for unmarried women and widows of his own family. Its official name was Det Grevelige Dannemandske Stift but was also referred to as Aastrup Kloster. The institution struggled with poor economy from the start and in 1884 Frederik Vilhelm Dannemand finally chose to sell Aastrup to Frederik Brockdorff. The sale resulted in a lawsuit and was overruled in 1890. The estate was then placed under administration until the economy had improved enough to revive the stift in 1928. Aastrup Kloster then existed until 1988.

Architecture
The main building is a three-winged complex. The east wing was built in 1613 by Enevold Kruse. It is constructed in red brick with crow-stepped gables and vaulted cellar. Above the gate is a sandstone plate with Enevold Kruse's and his wife Else Marsvin's names. It is unclear when the north wing was built but it is probably younger than the east wing. The west wing is from 1856. The north and west wings are also built in red brick. The entire complex was renovated in 1922-1928 by the architect V. Holck. The main building (all three wings) was listed on the Danish registry of protected buildings and structures in 1918.

The home farm (avlsgården) was built in circa 1870. It is not listed.

Estate
The estate has a total area of 688 hectares of which 363 hectares are farmland, 283 are woodland and 25 hectares are parkland.

Cultural references
Aastrup Kloster was used as a location in the 1950 family film Mosekongen. It was also used as a location in the DR television series Livsens Ondskab.

List of owners
 (     - 1564)      Erik Krabbe
 (1564-1582)      Glob Krabbe
 (1582-      )      Chr. Krabbe
 (     -1621)       Enevold Kruse
 (1621-1629)      Tyge Kruse
 (1629-1641)      Karen Kruse (Seefeld), née Sehested
 (1641-1664)      Jørgen Seefeld
 (1664)             Mogens Friis
 (1664-1685)      Peder Scavenius
 (1685-1708)      Niels Benzon
 (1708-1714)      Peder Benzon
 (1714-1731)      Gregers Juel
 (1731-1736)      Peder Juel
 (1736)             Johan Eichel
 (1736-1737)      Boet efter Johan Eichel
 (1737-1743)      Just Valentin Eichel
 (1743-1744)      Elisabeth Hedevig Eichel, gift Bartholin
 (1744-1765)      Caspar Christopher Bartholin
 (1765-1799)      Johan Bartholin Eichel
 (1799-1806)      Johan Bartholin Eichel
 (1806-1810)      Ulrik Chr. Von Schmidten
 (1810-1812)      Hans Peder Kofoed
 (1812-1838)      Marie Kofoed
 (1838-1842)      Siegfred Victor Raben
 (1842-1884)      Frederik Vilhelm Dannemand
 (1884-1890)	 Frederik Brockdorff (purchase since declared invalid)
 (1891-    )	 Det Grevelige Dannemandske Stift (Aastrup Kloster)

See also
 Sonnerupgaard

References

External links
 Official website
 Source

Manor houses in Lejre Municipality
Listed buildings and structures in Lejre Municipality
Listed castles and manor houses in Denmark
Buildings and structures associated with the Krabbe family
Buildings and structures associated with the Benzon  family
Buildings and structures associated with the Bartholin family